The list of Norwegian monarchs ( or kongerekka) begins in 872: the traditional dating of the Battle of Hafrsfjord, after which victorious King Harald Fairhair merged several petty kingdoms into that of his father. Named after the homonymous geographical region, Harald's realm was later to be known as the Kingdom of Norway.

Traditionally established in 872 and existing continuously for over 1,100 years, the Kingdom of Norway is one of the original states of Europe: King Harald V, who has reigned since 1991, is the 64th monarch according to the official list. During interregna, Norway has been ruled by variously titled regents.

Several royal dynasties have possessed the Throne of the Kingdom of Norway: the more prominent include the Fairhair dynasty (872–970), the House of Sverre (1184–1319), and the House of Oldenburg (1450–1481, 1483–1533, 1537–1814, and from 1905) including branches Holstein-Gottorp (1814–1818) and Schleswig-Holstein-Sonderburg-Glücksburg (from 1905). During the civil war era (1130–1240), several pretenders fought each other. Some rulers from this era are not traditionally considered lawful kings and are usually omitted from lists of monarchs. Between 1387 and 1905, Norway was part of various unions.

Kings of Norway used many additional titles between 1450 and 1905, such as King of the Wends, King of the Goths, Duke of Schleswig, Duke of Holstein, Prince of Rügen, and Count of Oldenburg. They called themselves Konge til Norge ("King of Norway"), usually with the style His Royal Majesty. With the introduction of constitutional monarchy in 1814, the traditional style "by the Grace of God" was extended to "by the Grace of God and the Constitution of the Kingdom", but was only briefly in use. The last king to use the by the grace of God style was Haakon VII, who died in 1957. The King's title today is formally Norges Konge ("Norway's King"), with the style "His Majesty".

Key
For lists of the prehistoric kings of Norway see List of legendary kings of Norway

Fairhair dynasty 

Besides becoming sole king after his father Harold's death, Eric Bloodaxe was king jointly with his father for three years before the latter's death. After Harald's death, Eric ruled as "overking" of his brothers, who also held status as kings and had control over certain regions. Harald Greycloak also ruled as "overking" of his brothers. All dates for the kings of the Fairhair dynasty are approximate and/or just scholarly estimates. Slight differences might therefore occur between different sources. The following table uses the dates given in Norsk biografisk leksikon/Store norske leksikon.

House of Gorm/Earl of Lade 

The Danish king Harald Bluetooth had himself hailed as king of Norway after the Battle of Fitjar ( 961). Besides gaining direct control of Viken in south-eastern Norway, he let Harald Greycloak rule the rest of Norway as king, nominally under himself. Harald Bluetooth later switched his support to Harald Greycloak's rival, Haakon Sigurdsson, Earl of Lade, who eventually captured Harald Greycloak's kingdom. Haakon thereafter ruled Norway (except Viken), at first nominally under Harald. All dates are estimates and subject to interpretation. Haakon is generally held as the ruler of Norway from 970 to 995.

Fairhair dynasty (restored)

House of Gorm/Earls of Lade (restored) 

After the Battle of Svolder, the Danes recaptured Norway under Sweyn Forkbeard. As before, the Danes controlled the petty kingdoms of Viken as vassals, while the two Earls of Lade, Eric Haakonsson and Sweyn Haakonsson, ruled Western Norway and Trøndelag, nominally as earls under Sweyn. Eric is generally held as the de facto ruler of Norway from 1000 to 1015, together with his brother Sweyn, a lesser known figure, with whom he shared his power.

St. Olaf dynasty

House of Gorm/Earl of Lade (restored, second time)

St. Olaf dynasty (restored)

Hardrada dynasty

Gille dynasty

Hardrada dynasty (restored), cognatic branch

Sverre dynasty

Gille dynasty, cognatic branch

Sverre dynasty (Restored)

House of Bjelbo

House of Estridsen

House of Griffin

House of Palatinate-Neumarkt

House of Bonde

House of Oldenburg

House of Holstein-Gottorp

House of Bernadotte

House of Glücksburg 

In 1905, Carl of Denmark was elected King of Norway and took the name Haakon VII. With him the House of Oldenburg, in the form of its junior branch, resumed occupancy of the throne of Norway.

See also 
 Monarchy of Norway
 List of heads of government of Norway
 List of Norwegian monarchs' coats of arms
 List of Norwegian monarchs' mottos
 List of Norwegian consorts
 Coronations in Norway
 Line of succession to the Norwegian throne
 Kings of Norway family tree

Notes and references 
Notes

References

External links 
 Official site of the Norwegian Royal House

 
Norway
Monarchs